Hostuviroid is a genus of viroids that includes Hop stunt viroid, a species of viroids that infects many different types of plants, including the common hop plant.

External links
ICTV Report: Pospiviroidae

Viroids
Virus genera